Madonna and Child with the Infant St John the Baptist and Saint Barbara is a 1548 oil on panel painting by Daniele da Volterra, now in the Uffizi, in Florence.

History
According to Benedetto Falconcini's Elogio this work and Elijah in the Desert were still in the artist's descendants' house in Volterra in 1772, before descending to the Pannocchieschi counts of Elci. An export bar was placed on the work in 1979 and it remained the last work by the artist in private hands until the Uffizi acquired it in September 2019.

References

1548 paintings
Paintings of the Madonna and Child
Paintings in the collection of the Uffizi
Paintings by Daniele da Volterra
Paintings depicting John the Baptist
Paintings of Saint Barbara